The second election to the Glamorgan County Council was held on 8 March 1892. The 1889 election was the first contest and the next was the 1895 election. Glamorgan County Council had been established by the 1888 Local Government Act, and the first election held in January 1889. Glamorgan was by far the largest county in Wales in terms of population. The county of Glamorgan was at this time becoming heavily industrialised, although some areas such as the Vale of Glamorgan remained essentially rural. The rise of nonconformist liberalism, especially since the 1860s, throughout Wales, had challenged the prevailing influence of the landed gentry. However, even in 1889, the traditional forces remained influential and no working men were elected to the Council. This changed in 1892 with the unopposed return of David Morgan in Aberdare and the success of Isaac Evans in Resolven.

Results are mainly drawn from the South Wales Star.

Most candidates were described either as Liberals or as Conservatives; but these allegiances were fluid, and in most cases there was no evidence of a connection between candidates and local Liberal or Conservative party organisations.

Overview of the Result

The Liberal Party was once again triumphant and won a majority of the seats. Indeed, in the contested elections only two Conservative-supported candidates were successful, Edwin Price and Bridgend and Captain Lindsay at Llantwit Fardre, Both stood as nominally Independent candidates.  The Liberals regarded their successes at Penarth to be among their most notable victories.

A notable feature of these elections was the return of a number of working men and others as Lib-Lab candidates. this was notable in the Rhondda but also elsewhere. David Morgan (Dai o'r Nant) was returned unopposed at Gadlys, Aberdare and two other miners' agents were elected. In the Garw Valley, John Thomas defeated another Liberal candidate while at Resolven, Isaac Evans defeated the sitting member, Edwards-Vaughan of Rheola.

The Conservatives held a number of seats unopposed and a small number of Independent candidates were returned. These were, in most cases, regarded as Conservatives, for example in Bridgend and Pontypridd.

Boundary Changes
There were a limited number of boundary changes at this election, resulting in the abolition of the six two-member wards which existed at the inaugural election in 1889. These were divided, in each case, into two single-member wards, as follows:

Candidates and Unopposed Returns
66 members were returned to the Council, all of whom represented single member wards.

There were 37 unopposed returns, as compared to a mere three at the initial election in 1889.

As shown in the table the vast majority were Liberals, although their number includes Rees Hopkin Rhys who was described as a Liberal at this election. Among the other unopposed returns was Sir John Jones Jenkins at Oystermouth and David Morgan at Gadlys.

Contested Elections

The election was fought on largely political lines with the Liberals contesting nearly every seat. In some cases two Liberals faced each other and there was little evidence of an attempt to limit the number of candidates in order to avoid splitting the vote and allowing a candidate of a different political persuasion to win the seat.  In many ways this provides evidence that the Liberal Party in Glamorgan was such a broad coalition that it encompassed both leading coal owners and active trade unionists. As such, tensions were almost inevitable.

Aberdare Valley

At the previous election, three Conservatives were returned for the five seats in the Aberdare area. On this occasion, four of the seats were won by Liberals, including David Morgan at Gadlys. The remaining Conservative, Rees Hopkin Rhys was now nominally at least, returned as a Liberal.

Cardiff and South Glamorgan

In this area the Conservatives were stronger than in the industrial valleys. However, the Liberals gained ground, notably by capturing both seats at Penarth.

Merthyr Tydfil
The Liberals also captured the majority of the seats in Merthyr Tydfil, although the Conservatives retained a firm grip on Dowlais and neighbouring Caeharris. At Cyfaththfa, the Labour candidate won a notable victory.

Rhondda District

In contrast to the somewhat raucous campaign three years earlier, the campaign in the Rhondda was a peaceful one although a number of the wards were closely contested. Most of the pits were closed early, the weather was fine. Vehicles belonging to various tradesmen conducted the electors to the polls and "scores of miners from different pits were to bo observed hastily trudging home to wash themselves before recording their votes for their favourite candidates. One striking feature in connection with the elections was the conspicuous absence of drunken persons about the booths and in the streets, and the quietness and tho amicable feeling prevailing among the supporters of the various candidates, who cordially shook hands with each other and chatted together freely for some time."

Retiring Aldermen
Before the election there was a widespread assumption, shared by a number of the retiring aldermen, that they would be automatically re-elected as aldermen without seeking election.  In the weeks before the election, there was a debate in the press about whether sitting aldermen could contest the election. This debate was fuelled to a considerable extent by personal rivalries and it soon became clear that there was nothing to prohibit sitting aldermen to seek election as councillors.

Of the eleven retiring aldermen, only three sought re-election and it appears that many of the others had assumed, wrongly as it transpired (see below, 'Election of Aldermen') that they would be-appointed without contesting an election. Both Gwilym Jones at Dyffryn and Aaron Davies at Pontlottyn were successful, while Rees Harries was returned unopposed at Llandeilo Talybont.

Results

Aberaman
Thomas Davies had been elected at a by-election in 1889 following the elevation of T.P. White to the aldermanic bench. White had moved from Cwmaman to Maesycymmer during the intervening period and did not seek re-election.

Aberavon
J.M. Smith had been elected at a by-election in 1889 following the elevation of Richard Jenkins to the aldermanic bench.

Aberdare Town

Barry and Cadoxton

John Claxton Meggitt had been elected at a by-election in 1889 following the elevation of John Cory to the aldermanic bench. In 1892 it was anticipated that Cory would be re-appointed as an alderman without facing the electorate, although Meggitt offered to stand down when this proved not to be the case. After the election, when the Liberal group decided that aldermen would be chosen only from amongst elected members, Meggitt reluctantly agreed to be nominated so that Cory could take the vacant seat (see 'By-elections' below).

Bridgend
The previous Conservative member, Lord Dunraven, elected in 1889, only attended two meetings of the council. The Liberal press, while deploring the failure of the Liberal candidate, described as a shrewd businessman, welcomed the fact that the interests of the town would now be represented. 
Three years later, when the Liberals captured the seat for the first time, it was recalled that Price, upon his victory, was carried shoulder-high to the Conservative Club. Although nominally a Conservative loss this was not how the result was widely regarded as the time.

Briton Ferry
At a by-election in 1889 following the elevation of William Hunter to the aldermanic bench, Jenkin Hill was defeated by the Conservative candidate, W.P. Struve. Struve did not seek re-election, allowing Hill to capture the seat in a straight fight with another Liberal candidate.

Caeharris

Caerphilly
Henry Anthony had been elected at a by-election in 1889 following the elevation of David Lewis to the aldermanic bench.

Coedffranc

Coity

Cowbridge
J.S. Gibbon had captured the seat for the Conservatives at a by-election in 1889 following the elevation of Thomas Rees to the aldermanic bench.

Cwmavon

Cyfarthfa

Cymmer
At a by-election in 1889 following the elevation of Dr Henry Naunton Davies to the aldermanic bench, his brother, Dr Evan Naunton Davies had been elected. In 1892, Evan Naunton Davies did not seek re-election, leading to a contest between the Lib-Lab candidate, Moses Moses, and Idris Williams, a native of the Rhondda and a prominent if somewhat controversial figure in the public life of the valley. Moses thus became the Rhondda's first labour county councillor. He was supported at the election by the Porth Labour Committee, and ad hoc organisation which did not re-appear at subsequent elections.

Dinas Powys

Dowlais

Dulais Valley

Ferndale

Gadlys
Although Benjamin Evans, the so-called 'Bishop of Gadlys', had initially intended to contest the seat he withdrew in favour of David Morgan, miners' agent.  The two men became bitter rivals in later years.

Garw Valley
The elected member was a miners' agent and ally of Mabon.

Gellifaelog

Gelligaer

Gower

Hirwaun
Morgan, returned at a by-election in 1889, was returned unopposed after rumours that he would be opposed by Owen Harris, a Trecynon tradesman involved in local politics, proved unfounded.

Kibbor

Llandaff

Llandeilo Talybont
Rees Harries had been elected alderman in 1889 and Thomas Freeman, who served as Mayor of Swansea in 1889-90 was returned unopposed at the ensuing by-election. At one stage it was reported that Freeman would contest the seat at this election, possibly because of the uncertainty over whether sitting aldermen could stand. However, Rees Harries decided to contest the seat and Freeman stood aside in his favour. Harries was not among the new aldermen elected by the Council.

Llansamlet

Llantrisant

Llantwit Vardre
This contest was regarded as the only instance in the county where a Liberal was ousted by a Conservative. Lindsay, although running as an Independent was regarded as a Conservative.

Llwydcoed
Rhys, a prominent figure in the public life of Aberdare for decades and Chairman of the Local Board of Health, was returned unopposed. Although described as a Liberal he had in the past been associated with the Conservative Party and his return in 1889 had been regarded as a defeat for the local Liberal Association.

Llwynypia and Clydach

Lougher and Penderry

Maesteg

Margam

Merthyr Town

Merthyr Vale

Morriston

Mountain Ash

Neath (North)

Neath (South)
John Arnold died, aged 49, shortly before the next election in 1895.

Newcastle

Ogmore

Ogmore Valley

Oystermouth

Penarth North
This was regarded by the Liberals as one of the most significant contests, as David Morgan's personal popularity was expected to be a factor.

Penarth South
The Liberal candidate, who was said to be popular among Conservatives as well as Liberals, had refused to stand as an Independent.

Penrhiwceiber

Pentre
Morris, the sitting member and official Rhondda Labour and Liberal Association candidate in 1889, found himself at odds with the RLLA local committee which chose estate went Elias Henry Davies to oppose him. The third Liberal candidate, Daniel Eynon, was a colliery manager.

Penydarren

Plymouth

Pontardawe

Pontlottyn

Pontypridd

Porth and Penygraig
Morgan Williams. lodge secretary at Ynyshir Colliery,  was supported at the election by the Porth Labour Committee, and ad hoc organisation which did not re-appear at subsequent elections.

Resolven

Sketty

Tirdeunaw

Treforest
The sitting councillor did not seek re-election and it was felt that the young Liberal candidate, 'Willie' Spickett faced a formidable opponent in the Chair of the Pontypridd Local Board of Health. Leyshon stood as an Independent but was regarded as a Conservative candidate.

Treherbert

Treorchy
Daronwy Isaac, miners' agent and ally of Mabon, stood as an unofficial candidate although he was President of the Rhondda Labour and Liberal Association. His opponent, William Morris was minister of Noddfa, Treorchy and already active in local government as a member of the Ystradyfodwg School Board.

Trealaw and Tonypandy
The contest was reported to have been conducted with bitterness and bad feeling. Mr. Williams's record on the Council is a very satisfac- tory one. and it would have been hard indeed not to return one who has been tried and not found wanting. At the same time we are sorry that the Councifshould be without the services of Mr. T. P. Jenkins, who for many years was the chairman of the Rhondda Liberal and Labour Association, the first labour magistrate in Wales, and a man of great business capacity. The conflict between two good Liberals was most unfortunate. especially since it has generated so much ill feeling, and it is unfortunate that Mr. Jenkins did not elect to stand for another constituency against a Tory candidate.

Tylorstown and Ynyshir

Ystalyfera

Ystrad
Thomas, the retiring councillor, announced that he would not seek re-election but reversed his decision on learning that Cory would be the new candidate.

Election of Aldermen

In addition to the 66 councillors the council consisted of 22 county aldermen. Aldermen were elected by the council, and served a six-year term. Following the 1892, there were eleven Aldermanic vacancies.

At a meeting of the South Wales Liberal Federation in Cardiff, a decision was taken that only elected members be elected aldermen.  Even the Liberal journal, the South Wales Star thought that it was unfortunate that this ruling was made after the election when only three sitting aldermen had stood.

Two of the three retiring aldermen who had contested the election were re-elected to the aldermanic bench, namely Aaron Davies and W.H. Mathias. Rees Harries was not re-elected. J.C. Meggitt consented to be elected an alderman in order to allow John Cory to return as councillor for Barry (see below). The election of Moses Moses suggests that Liberal representatives on the County Council were more prepared than local leaders in the Rhondda to advance labour representatives.

The following aldermen were appointed by the newly elected council.

David Price Davies, Liberal (elected councillor at Aberdare Town)
John Powell, Liberal (elected councillor at Sketty)
Sir Hussey Vivian MP, Liberal, elected councillor at Tirdeunaw
Herbert Evans, Liberal, elected councillor at Cwmavon
Rev Aaron Davies, Liberal, retiring alderman (elected Councillor at Pontlottyn)
Henry Anthony, Liberal (elected councillor at Caerphilly)
Moses Moses, Liberal-Labour (elected councillor at Cymmer)
John Williams, Liberal (elected councillor at Ogmore Valley)
W.H. Mathias, Liberal (elected councillor at Tylorstown and Ynyshir)
Gwilym Jones, Liberal, retiring alderman (elected councillor at Mountain Ash)
J.C. Meggitt, Liberal (elected councillor at Barry and Cadoxton)

By-elections

Aberdare Town by-election
In the Town Ward, Aberdare, following David Price Davies's election as alderman, the contest was said to have created an intense amount of enthusiasm and more excitement than has been known to an election in this parish for many years.

Barry and Cadoxton by-election
John Cory was returned unopposed following john Claxton Meggitt's reluctant elevation to the aldermanic bench to make way for him.

Caerphilly by-election
Following Henry Anthony's election as alderman, Richard Hill-Male, who had opposed him at the recent election, was now chosen as the official nominee of the Liberal Association. However, David Lewis, elected as Liberal councillor in 1889 and whose aldermanic term had lapsed also chose to contest the seat, and a number of lively meetings took place. On polling day, Hill-Male was returned with a comfortable majority.

Cwmavon by-election
The by-election followed the election of Herbert Evans as alderman.

Cymmer by-election
Idris Williams, narrowly defeated at the recent election by Moses Moses. was returned unopposed after a stormy meeting at Bethania Chapel, Dinas, when only members of the Liberal Association (the so-called 'Three Hundred') were allowed to vote. Eventually, Williams, who was also narrowly defeated at the 1889 election, was unanimously selected. Technically, the return of Williams represented a Liberal gain.

Mountain Ash by-election

Ogmore Valley by-election
William Llewellyn, grocer, of Gwalia House, Tynewydd defeated William Jenkins, Ystradfechan, Treorchy, mining engineer at the Ocean Collieries.

Pontlottyn by-election

Sketty by-election
Following the election of John Powell as alderman, Robert Armine Morris, a prominent figure in the municipal life of Swansea, and a member of a leading family in the industrial life of the district, won the seat for the Conservatives. The campaign included a public meeting addressed by both candidates. Prominent local Liberals were alleged to have at least tacitly supported Morris.

Tirdeunaw by-election
Following the election of Sir H. Hussey Vivian, the chairman of the Council, as an alderman, two Liberal candidates contested the vacancy. Thomas Freeman was a past Mayor of Swansea and a prominent figure in the public life of the town who had also served as councillor for Llandeilo Talybont on the first council. He was defeated by Llewellyn Davies who had unsuccessfully contested Margam against A.P. Vivian in 1889.

Tylorstown and Ynyshir by-election
The candidate was returned unopposed following a meeting of electors at Hermon, Pontygwaith. This outcome appears to have been challenged by the supporters of a certain Mr Fenwick, and a further meeting was held at which Hughes was again chosen, by 80 votes against 67 for Fenwick.

References

Bibliography

1892
Glamorgan
19th century in Glamorgan